Francis Asekhame Alimikhena (born 20 September 1947) is a Senator of the Federal Republic of Nigeria from Edo State. He was first elected in 2015 to represent Edo North Senatorial District in the Senate and was reelected to a second term in 2019. Senator Alimikhena is the vice-chairman, Senate Committee on Housing and also a member of the Senate committee on Constitutional Review.

Alimikhena is a member of the Peoples Democratic Party (Nigeria) (PDP). He was the Deputy Chief Whip of the 8th National Assembly.

Edo North Senatorial District covers six local government areas: (Etsako West, Etsako Central, Etsako East, Owan East, Owan West and Akoko Edo).

Childhood, military and education
Alimikhena was born in Igiode area of Etsako East local government area in Edo state on 20 September 1947. He was born into a strong catholic Christian home and grew up with a strong Christian principle.

He joined the Nigerian Army as a commissioned officer in 1972. He was later commissioned as a lieutenant in 1982 and then held the position of Adjutant, Army Garrison between 1985 and 1989 and later promoted a Major in 1992. Alimikhena was awarded the Forces Service Star (FSS) in 1999. An honour meant for service Officers who have served the Army without blemish. Other positions held are Senior Officer (finance): Nigerian Army School of Engineering, Makurdi, Benue State, Nigerian Army Pension Board and Army Petroleum Trust Fund between 1999 and 2000. He retired from the Army a Major in 2000.

Alimikhena started his education at Saint Thomas Secondary Modern School, and left in 1981.  Thereafter, he proceeded to the University of Buckingham, United Kingdom to study Law. He earned a Bachelor of Law (L.L.B) in 2003 and was later called to the Nigerian Bar as a solicitor and advocate of the supreme court of Nigeria.

Private enterprise and philanthropic service 
Alimikhena is an astute business man and philanthropist. He currently seat on the board of so many companies. He is currently the chairman of Falzal group of companies, Vice Chairman of Solidgate properties, Managing partner at FA Alimikhena & Co (Global Chambers) and also was the President of Anthony BBC between 1994 and 1997.

His philanthropic work within the Catholic church family also gave him the honour of the certificate of the Mariam queen of the universe shrine in Orlando Florida, United States also Pope Benedict XVI honoured him with the papal knight of Saint Gregory the great. He is also a member of Knight of Saint Mulumba (KSM) and was given a respected traditional title as the OKHASO of wappa Wanno Kingdom by the Afemai people.

Political campaign and governance
In 2007, Alimikhena joined politics by contesting for the Edo North senatorial seat under the platform of People's Democratic Party but lost. He later contested in 2011 for the same senatorial post but lost again. Thereafter defected to the All Progressives Congress and contested for the same senatorial seat in 2015 and won after polling a total of 86,021 to beat his closest rival Pascal Ugbome of the People's Democratic Party who polled 66,062 votes.

Senator of the Federal Republic of Nigeria
Alimikhena was elected to the Senate of the Federal Republic of Nigeria as the All Progressives Congress candidate from Edo North in March 2015. He won the election with 86,021 votes. He was sworn in as a senator on 6 June 2015. Alimikena was the only elected All Progressives Congress senator in the entire South South and South Eastern part of Nigeria in 2015 general election.
He ran for the position of Deputy Senate President in 2019.

Alimikhena has sponsored several bills in the Senate:

 Chartered Institute of Capital Market Registrar (est., etc.) Bill 2015 (SB. 25)
 A Bill for an Act to provide for the Establishment of Environmental Managers Registration Council of Nigeria to provide for Code of Conduct, Professional Ethics and Stipulation of Minimum Standards and for other related matters, 2016 (S.B. 88)
 Agricultural Processing Zones Establishing Bill 2016 	
 Establishment of national commission for persons with disabilities (SB22)

On 19 December 2014, he emerged as the senatorial candidate of the All Progressives Congress (APC) in a heated party primary election at Edo state.

Family life
Senator Alimikhena is married to Lady Alimikhena and blessed with children.

Memberships and clubs
 Member, Nigerian bar association (NBA)
 Member, International Bar Association (IBA)
 Member, IBB Lagos golf club Ikeja	
 Member, Usagbe club of Nigeria

Projects
 Building of Igiode Primary school
 Functional health center in Igiode
 Functional boreholes in Igiode

References

1947 births
Living people
Edo State politicians
Alumni of the University of Buckingham
All Progressives Congress politicians
Members of the Senate (Nigeria)
Nigerian Christians